The Mansfield Building Society is a UK building society, which has its headquarters in Mansfield, Nottinghamshire. It is a member of the Building Societies Association.

References

External links
Mansfield Building Society
Building Societies Association
 KPMG Building Societies Database 2008

Mansfield
Building societies of England
Banks established in 1869
Organizations established in 1869
Organisations based in Nottinghamshire
1869 establishments in England